Drimylastis is a genus of moths belonging to the family Tineidae.

Species
Drimylastis stiphropa Meyrick, 1924
Drimylastis clausa Meyrick, 1919 (=Xyloscopa heterocrossa Meyrick, 1920)
Drimylastis craterozona Meyrick, 1932
Drimylastis telamonia Meyrick, 1907

References

Meessiinae